A deacon is a member of the diaconate, an office in Christian churches that is generally associated with service of some kind, but which varies among theological and denominational traditions. Major Christian churches, such as the Catholic Church, the Oriental Orthodox Churches, the Eastern Orthodox Church, the Scandinavian Lutheran Churches, the Methodist Churches, the Anglican Communion, and the Free Church of England, view the diaconate as an order of ministry.

Origin and development 
The word deacon is derived from the Greek word , which is a standard ancient Greek word meaning "servant", "waiting-man", "minister", or "messenger".

It is generally assumed that the office of deacon originated in the selection of seven men by the apostles, among them Stephen, to assist with the charitable work of the early church as recorded in Acts of the Apostles chapter 6.

The Greek word , meaning deaconess, is not found in the Bible. However, one woman, Phoebe, is mentioned at Romans 16:1–2 as a deacon or deaconess of the church in Cenchreae. Nothing more specific is said about her duties or authority, although it is assumed she carried Paul's Letter to the Romans.

Female deacons are mentioned by the Roman author Pliny the Younger in a letter to the Roman emperor Trajan dated :

This is the earliest Latin text that appears to refer to female deacons as a distinct category of Christian minister.

A biblical description of the qualities required of a deacon can be found in 1 Timothy 3:1–13.

Among the more prominent deacons in history are:

 Stephen, the first Christian martyr (the "protomartyr")
 Philip, whose baptism of the Ethiopian eunuch is recounted in Acts 8:26–40
 Phoebe, who is mentioned in the Letter to the Romans
 Lawrence, an early Roman martyr
 Vincent of Saragossa, protomartyr of Spain
 Francis of Assisi, founder of the mendicant Franciscans
 Ephrem the Syrian
 Romanos the Melodist, a prominent early hymnographer

Prominent historical figures who played major roles as deacons and went on to higher office include Athanasius of Alexandria, Thomas Becket, and Reginald Pole. On June 8, 536, a serving Roman deacon was raised to Pope, Silverius.

The diaconate has been retained as a separate vocation in Eastern Christianity, while in Western Christianity it was largely used in cathedrals and as a temporary step along the path toward priestly ordination. In the 20th century, the diaconate was restored as a vocational order in many Western churches, most notably in the Catholic Church, the Anglican Communion, and the United Methodist Church.

By Christian denomination
In the Catholic, Scandinavian Lutheran, Anglican, Eastern Orthodox, Oriental Orthodox, and Persian churches, the diaconate is one of the major orders—the others being bishop, presbyter (priest), and, historically, subdeacon. Deacons assist priests in their pastoral and administrative duties, but often report directly to the bishops of their diocese. They have a distinctive role in the liturgy of the Eastern and Western Churches.

Deacons are also appointed or elected in other denominations, though this is less commonly seen as a step towards the clerical ministry.  The role of deacon in these denominations varies greatly from denomination to denomination; often, there will be more emphasis on administrative duties than on pastoral or liturgical duties. In some denominations, deacons' duties are only financial management and practical aid and relief. Elders handle pastoral and other administrative duties.

Latin Catholicism

Beginning around the fifth century, there was a gradual decline in the diaconate as a permanent state of life in the Latin Church. The development of a cursus honorum (sequence of offices) found men entering the clerical state through tonsure, then ordination to the minor orders of lector, porter, exorcist, acolyte before ordination to the major orders of sub-deacon and deacon, all stages on the path to priesthood. Only men destined for priesthood were permitted to be ordained deacons. As seminaries developed, following the Council of Trent, to contemporary times, the only men ordained as deacons were seminarians who were completing the last year or so of graduate theological training, so-called "transitional deacons."

Following the recommendations of the Second Vatican Council (Lumen gentium 29) and the instigation of the Josephites (whose work with African Americans necessitated increased vocational opportunity for married men), in 1967 Pope Paul VI issued the motu proprio Sacrum Diaconatus Ordinem, reviving the practice of ordaining to the diaconate men who were not candidates for priestly ordination. These men are known as permanent deacons, in contrast to those continuing their formation, who were then called transitional deacons. There is no sacramental or canonical difference between the two, however, as there is only one order of deacons.

The period of formation to the permanent diaconate varies from diocese to diocese as determined by the local ordinary, but it usually entails a period of prayerful preparation and several years of study. Diaconal candidates receive instruction in philosophy, theology, study of the Bible, homiletics, sacramental studies, evangelization, ecclesiology, counseling, and pastoral care and ministry before ordination.

They may be assigned to work in a parish by the diocesan bishop, where they are under the supervision of the parish pastors, or in diocesan ministries. Unlike most clerics, permanent deacons who also have a secular profession have no right to receive a salary for their ministry, but many dioceses opt to remunerate them anyway.

During the mass, the deacon's responsibilities include assisting the priest, proclaiming the Gospel, announcing the General Intercessions, and distributing Communion. They may also preach the homily. As clerics, deacons are required to pray the Liturgy of the Hours.  Deacons, like priests and bishops, are ordinary ministers of the sacrament of Baptism and may witness at the sacrament of holy matrimony outside of mass. Deacons may lead funeral rites outside mass such as the final commendation at the gravesite or the reception of the body at a service in the funeral home, and may assist the priest at the requiem mass. They can also preside over various services such as Benediction of the Blessed Sacrament, and they may give certain blessings. While in ancient history their tasks and competencies varied, today deacons cannot hear confession and give absolution, anoint the sick, or celebrate mass.

The vestments most particularly associated with the Western Rite Catholic deacon are the alb, stole and dalmatic. Deacons, like priests and bishops, must wear their albs and stoles; deacons place the stole over their left shoulder and it hangs across to their right side, while priests and bishops wear it around their necks. The dalmatic, a vestment especially associated with the deacon, is worn during the celebration of the mass and other liturgical functions; its use is more liberally applied than the corresponding vestment of the priest, the chasuble. At certain major celebrations, such as ordinations, the diocesan bishop wears a dalmatic under his chasuble, to signify that he enjoys the fullness of the three degrees of holy orders—deacon, priest, and bishop.The  diaconate is conferred on seminarians continuing to the priesthood no sooner than 23 years of age (canon 1031 of the Code of Canon Law). As a permanent state, the diaconate can be conferred on single men 25 or older, and on married men 35 or older, but an older age can be required by the episcopal conference. If a married deacon is widowed, he must maintain the celibate state. Under some very rare circumstances, however, deacons who have been widowed can receive permission to remarry. This is most commonly done when the deacon is left as a single father. In some cases, a widowed deacon will seek priestly ordination, especially if his children are grown.

A deacon is not styled "Father" as a priest would be, but as "Deacon", abbreviated variously as "Dn." or "Dcn." This preferred method of address is stated in the 2005 document of the United States Conference of Catholic Bishops, "National Directory for the Formation, Ministry and Life of Permanent Deacons in the United States". 

The proper address in written correspondence for all deacons of the Latin (Roman Rite) Catholic Church in the United States is "Deacon Name", although it is not uncommon to see "Rev. Mr." sometimes used. "Rev. Mr.", however, is more often used to indicate a transitional deacon (i.e., preparing for ordination to the priesthood) or one who belongs to a religious institute, while Rev. Deacon is used as the honorific for permanent deacons in many dioceses (e.g., Rev. Deacon John Smith, or Deacon John Smith). The decision as to whether deacons wear the Roman collar as street attire is left to the discretion of each bishop for his own diocese. Where clerical garb is approved by the bishop, the deacon can choose to wear or not wear the "collar".

Deacons, like seminarians, religious, and the two other orders, bishops and priests, pray the Liturgy of the Hours; however, deacons are usually only required to pray morning and evening prayer.

Eastern Orthodoxy and Eastern Catholicism

In addition to proclaiming the Gospel and assisting in the distribution of holy communion, the deacon censes the icons and people, calls the people to prayer, leads the litanies, and has a role in the dialogue of the anaphora. In keeping with Eastern tradition, he is not permitted to perform any sacred mysteries (sacraments) on his own, except for Baptism in extremis (in danger of death), conditions under which anyone, including the laity, may baptize. When assisting at a normal baptism, it is often the deacon who goes down into the water with the one being baptized. In contrast to the Roman Catholic Church, deacons in the Eastern Churches may not preside at the celebration of marriages, as in Eastern theology the sacrament is conferred by the nuptial blessing of a priest.

Diaconal vestments are the sticharion (dalmatic), the orarion (deacon's stole), and the epimanikia (cuffs). The last are worn under his sticharion, not over it as does a priest or bishop.  The deacon usually wears a simple orarion which is only draped over the left shoulder but, if elevated to the rank of archdeacon, he wears the "doubled-orarion", meaning it is passed over the left shoulder, under the right arm, and then crossed over the left shoulder (see photograph, right).  In modern Greek practice, a deacon wears this doubled orarion from the time of his ordination.  Also, in the Greek practice, he wears the clerical kamilavka (cylindrical head covering) with a rim at the top. In Slavic practice, a hierodeacon (monastic deacon) wears the simple black kamilavka of a monk (without the rim), but he removes the monastic veil (see klobuk) when he is vested; a married deacon would not wear a kamilavka unless it is given to him by the bishop as an ecclesiastical award; the honorary kamilavka is purple in colour, and may be awarded to either married or monastic clergy.

As far as street clothing is concerned, immediately following his ordination the deacon receives a blessing to wear the exorasson (Arabic: Jib'be, Slavonic: riassa), an outer cassock with wide sleeves, in addition to the anterion (Slavonic: podraznik), the inner cassock worn by all orders of clergy. In the Slavic practice, married clergy may wear any of a number of colours, but most often grey, while monastic clergy always wear black. In certain jurisdictions in North America and Western Europe, a Roman collar is often worn, although this is not a traditional or widespread practice.

A protodeacon (Greek: πρωτοδιάκονος: protodiakonos, "first deacon") is a distinction of honor awarded to senior deacons, usually serving on the staff of the diocesan bishop. An archdeacon is similar, but is among the monastic clergy. Protodeacons and archdeacons use a double-length orarion even if it is not the local tradition for all deacons to use it. In the Slavic tradition a deacon may be awarded the doubled-orarion even if he is not a protodeacon or archdeacon.

According to the practice of the Greek Orthodox Church of America, in keeping with the tradition of the Ecumenical Patriarchate, the most common way to address a deacon is "Father". Depending on local tradition, deacons are addressed as either "Father", "Father Deacon", "Deacon Father", or if addressed by a bishop, simply as "Deacon".

The tradition of kissing the hands of ordained clergy extends to the diaconate as well.  This practice is rooted in the holy eucharist and is in acknowledgement and respect of the eucharistic role members of the clergy play in preparing, handling and disbursing the sacrament during the Divine Liturgy, and in building and serving the church as the Body of Christ.

Anciently, the Eastern churches ordained women as deaconesses. This practice fell into desuetude in the second millennium, but has been revived in some Orthodox and Oriental Orthodox churches. Nectarios of Aegina ordained a number of nuns as deaconesses in convents. Deaconesses would assist in anointing and baptising women, and in ministering to the spiritual needs of the women of the community.  As churches discontinued ordaining women as deacons, these duties largely fell to the nuns and to the priests' wives.

Lutheranism
In the Lutheran Churches of the Scandinavian tradition, there is a threefold ministry of "bishops, priests, and deacons". Until the 1960s, deacons in the Church of Sweden were required to be celibate. For deacons, "vows made at ordination involve seeking and helping anyone in bodily or spiritual need, defending the rights of all, standing beside the oppressed, and exhorting God's people to all good works so that the love of God is made visible in the world." An ordained deacon's charism includes "visits, helps, and supports those in bodily or spiritual need; gives Christian nurture and teaching in the faith; is a sign of merciful kindness in the parish and society at large, and in all things serves Christ in the neighbour".

Anglicanism

In Anglican churches, including the Free Church of England, deacons are permitted to marry freely before or after ordination, as are Anglican priests. Most deacons are "transitional", that is, preparing for the priesthood and they are usually ordained priests about a year after their diaconal ordination. However, there are some deacons who do not go on to receive priestly ordination, recognising a vocation to remain in the diaconate. A permanent deacon is also known as a "distinctive deacon", or a "vocational deacon". 

Many provinces of the Anglican Communion ordain both women and men as deacons. Many of those provinces that ordain women to the priesthood previously allowed them to be ordained only to the diaconate. The effect of this was the creation of a large and overwhelmingly female diaconate for a time, as most men proceeded to be ordained priests after a short time as a deacon.

Anglican deacons may baptize and in some dioceses are granted licences to solemnize matrimony, usually under the instruction of their parish priest and bishop. Deacons are not able to preside at the eucharist (but can lead worship with the distribution of already-consecrated communion elements where this is permitted), nor can they pronounce God's absolution of sin or pronounce the Trinitarian blessing. In most cases, deacons minister alongside other clergy.

An Anglican deacon wears an identical choir dress to an Anglican priest: cassock, surplice, tippet and academic hood. However, liturgically, deacons usually wear a stole over their left shoulder and fastened on the right side of their waist. This is worn both over the surplice and the alb. A deacon might also wear a dalmatic. Church of England deacons are supported through the CofE Network of Distinctive Deacons (CENDD). Bishop James Newcome of Carlisle is the Distinctive Deacons’ Champion in the House of Bishops.

Methodist churches

In Methodism, deacons began as a transitional order before ordination as elders (presbyters). In 1996, the United Methodist Church ended the transitional deacon and established a new Order of Deacons to be equal in status with the Order of Elders. Both men and women may be ordained as deacons. Deacons serve in a variety of specialized ministries including, but not limited to, Christian education, music, communications and ministries of justice and advocacy. Unlike United Methodist elders, deacons must find their own place of service. Nevertheless, the bishop does officially approve and appoint deacons to their selected ministry. Deacons may assist the elder in the administration of Sacraments, but must receive special approval from a bishop before presiding over Baptism and holy communion. United Methodist deacons are present in North America, Europe and Africa.

The Methodist Church of Great Britain also has a permanent diaconate—based on an understanding of the New Testament that deacons have an equal, but distinct ministry from presbyters. Deacons are called to a ministry of service and witness, and "to hold before them the needs and concerns of the world". The Methodist Diaconal Order is both an order of ministry and a religious order within the Methodist Church in Britain. It was formed in 1989 as a successor to the Wesley Deaconess Order and is open to both women and men. Diaconal ministry is one of two ordained ministries within the Methodist Church. The original Wesleyan Deaconess Order was founded by Thomas Bowman Stephenson in 1890, following observation of new ministries in urban areas in the previous years. The order continued as the Wesley Deaconess Order following Methodist Union in 1932, but, following the admission of women to "The Ministry" (as presbyteral ministry is commonly termed in the Methodist Church), a number of deaconesses transferred and recruitment for the WDO ceased from 1978. The 1986 Methodist Conference re-opened the order to both men and women and the first ordinations to the renewed order occurred during the 1990 Conference in Cardiff, which coincided with celebrations of 100 years of diaconal service in British Methodism; deaconesses had previously been ordained at their annual convocation.

The Methodist Church of Southern Africa ordains deacons who constitute a diaconal order, similar to that in the British church.

Reformed churches

Church of Scotland
There are two distinct offices of deacon in the Church of Scotland. The best-known form of diaconate are trained and paid pastoral workers. The permanent diaconate was formerly exclusively female, and it was in 1988, the centenary year of the diaconate, that men were admitted to the office of deacon. The offices of deacon and minister are now both open to both women and men; deacons are now ordained (they were previously "commissioned").

The other office of deacon can be found in congregations formerly belonging to the pre-1900 Free Church of Scotland, with a "Deacons' Court" having responsibility for financial and administrative oversight of congregations. Only a few congregations still retain this constitutional model, with most having since adopted the Church of Scotland's "Model Constitution" (with a Kirk Session and Congregational Board) or "Unitary Congregation" (with just a Kirk Session). Most of the Free Church congregations united with the United Presbyterian Church of Scotland in 1900 creating the United Free Church of Scotland, which itself united with the Church of Scotland in 1929.

The congregations of the post-1900 Free Church of Scotland which did not join the UF Church in 1900 continue to have Deacons.

Presbyterian churches 
One of John Calvin's legacies was to restore the diaconate as a servant ministry. Individual congregations of the various Presbyterian denominations, such as the Presbyterian Church (USA), Presbyterian Church in America and Orthodox Presbyterian Church, also elect deacons, along with elders. However, in some churches the property-functions of the diaconate and session of elders is commended to an independent board of trustees.

Dutch Reformed churches 
In many Dutch Reformed churches deacons are charged with ministries of mercy. As such, the deacons are also members of the local church council. A special feature of the Dutch Reformed churches is the fact that the diaconate of each local church is its own legal entity with its own financial means, separated from the church itself, and governed by the deacons.

Uniting Church in Australia
In the Uniting Church in Australia, the diaconate is one of two offices of ordained ministry. The other is Minister of the Word.

Deacons in the Uniting Church are called to minister to those on the fringes of the church and be involved in ministry in the community. Deacons offer leadership in a ministry of service to the world. The primary focus of the ministry of deacons is on care and compassion for the poor and oppressed and in seeking social justice for all people. They take both an active role in leadership in such actions themselves, but are also play a key role in encouraging other Uniting Church members in similar action.

Some examples of service that deacons may take include: prison chaplaincy, acting as youth or community workers, in community service agencies, in schools and hospitals, or in mission placements in Australia or overseas. Although the primary responsibility for worship in congregations lies with the Ministers of the Word, deacons have a liturgical role appropriate to their distinctive ministry, including ministries where their main leadership is within a congregation.

In the Uniting Church both ministers of the word and deacons are styled The Reverend.

The Uniting Church has recognised deacons since union, but it was not until the 6th Assembly in 1991 that the Uniting Church began ordaining deacons. This was partly because the historical, theological and sociological roles of deaconesses and deacons was being widely discussed in Churches throughout the world at the time that the Basis of Union was being drafted

Anabaptist Churches

Amish
The Amish have deacons; they are elected by a council and receive no formal training.

Schwarzenau Brethren

Church of the Brethren
The Church of the Brethren also have deacons, as do other Brethren denominations.  They are elected by the congregation to serve in ministries of compassion.  They are elected for life in some congregations.

Baptists
Baptists traditionally recognize two ordained positions in the church: elders (pastors) and deacons, as per 1 Timothy 3.  Some Baptist churches in the Reformed tradition recognize elder and pastor as separate offices.

Baptists have traditionally practised congregationalism, giving each church the ability to discern for themselves the interpretation of scripture.  Thus, Baptist churches hold a wide variety of views on the qualifications and activities of deacons: some Baptist churches have the deacons decide many of the church affairs, while others have deacons in serving roles only.

The predominant view among Baptist churches (especially theologically conservative ones, including the majority of Southern Baptist and Independent Baptist churches) is that a deacon must be a male, and married (or a widower) and not divorced previously.  If a deacon subsequently divorces, he must relinquish his office (but if his wife dies he may continue to serve).  However, there are Baptist churches where women are allowed to be deacons or deaconesses (primarily in the United Kingdom and in the United States among African-American and theologically moderate churches).  In the General Association of Regular Baptist Churches, deacons can be any adult male member of the congregation who is in good standing.

In some African American Missionary Baptist churches and in churches affiliated with the National Baptist Convention, USA, Inc. male and female deacons serve as one board. Other churches may have two separate boards of deacons and deaconesses. Most often the deacon or deacon candidate is a long-standing member of the church, being middle aged, but younger deacons may be selected from among members of a family that has had several generations in the same church.  They are elected by quorum vote annually. Their roles are semi-pastoral in that they fill in for the pastor on occasion, or support the pastor vocally during his sermon. They may also lead a special prayer service, generally known as "The deacon's Prayer." Their other roles are to accompany the pastor during Communion by handing out the remembrances of bread and wine (or grape juice) and to set a good example for others to follow.  Their administrative duties sometimes include oversight of the treasury, Sunday school curriculum, transportation, and various outreach ministries.

See Baptist Distinctives for a more detailed treatment of deacons in churches in other associations, particularly the UK.

Quakers
Deacons in the structure of most meetings of the Religious Society of Friends (Quakers) are called overseers. This is not an ordained role but rather a temporary ministry that is discerned every three years. They are responsible for coordinating pastoral care within a community while elders (the equivalent of the Biblical presbyterate) take care of the spiritual concerns of the meeting. Other names include "pastoral care" or "care and counsel".

Church of Christ
In accordance with Church of Christ doctrine and practice, only males may serve as deacons (deaconesses are not recognized), and must meet Biblical qualifications (generally I Timothy 3:8-13 is the Biblical text used to determine if a male is qualified to serve as deacon).  A deacon may also be qualified to serve as an elder (and, in fact, may move into that role after a period of time if his service as deacon is considered acceptable).

The role of the deacon varies, depending on the local congregation.  Generally a deacon will have responsibility for a specific non-spiritual function (e.g. finance, building and grounds, benevolence); however, the deacons (like the rest of the congregation) are under the subjection of the elders, who have spiritual and administrative authority over the deacon's function.

In congregations which lack qualified elders (where, in their absence, the men of the congregation handle leadership duties), often there also are no deacons, as they are usually appointed by the elders of the church.

Irvingian Churches

New Apostolic Church
In the New Apostolic Church, the deacon ministry is a local ministry.  A deacon mostly works in his home congregation to support the priests.  If a priest is unavailable, a deacon will hold a divine service, without the act of communion (Only priests and up can consecrate holy communion).

Restorationist Churches

The Church of Jesus Christ of Latter-day Saints

The office of deacon is generally open to all 12- and 13-year-old male members of the LDS church; all are encouraged to become deacons. Duties include:

 Gather fast offerings.
 Pass the sacrament.
 Serve as the bishop's messenger.
 Care for the grounds and physical facilities of the church.
 Assist in service projects or welfare assignments as assigned by the bishop.
 Watch over the church and act as standing ministers (see D&C 84:111).
 Be involved in missionary and reactivation efforts (see D&C 20:58–59).
 Assist teachers in all their duties as needed (see D&C 20:53, 57).

Iglesia ni Cristo
Iglesia ni Cristo's deacons serve as worship service's strict etiquette checkers in male's seatings, deaconesses are their female counterparts. They also serve as offering collectors and other church duties during worship services. Deacons are required to be married people of strong faith and good example. There is also a head deacon, who leads the congregation in prayer before the sermon and the prayer for voluntary offerings. They were also can be promoted to Bishops, if they are faithful to the rules.

Jehovah's Witnesses
Deacons among Jehovah's Witnesses are referred to as ministerial servants, claiming it preferable to translate the descriptive Greek term used in the Bible rather than merely transliterate it as though it were a title. Appointed ministerial servants aid elders in congregational duties. Like the elders, they are adult baptized males and serve voluntarily.

Deaconesses

The title "woman deacon" or "deaconess" appears in many documents from the early church period, particularly in the East. Their duties were often different from that of male deacons; women deacons prepared adult women for baptism and they had a general apostolate to female Christians and catechumens (typically for the sake of modesty). Women appear to have been ordained as deacons to serve the larger community until about the 6th century in the West. Liturgies for the ordination of women deacons had similarities with as well as differences from those for male deacons. Opinions on the sacramental nature of the ordination vary: some scholars argue that the ordination of women deacons would have been equally sacramental to that of male deacons, while others say that women deacons of history were not sacramentally ordained in the full sense, as determined in the Catholic Church by Canons 1008 and 1009 of the Code of Canon Law.

The Catholic Church presently does not recognise the validity of female ordinations, be it to the diaconate or any other clerical order. In August 2016, the Catholic Church established a Study Commission on the Women's Diaconate to study the history of female deacons and to study the possibility of ordaining women as deacons. Until today, the Armenian Apostolic Church is still ordaining religious sisters as deaconesses, the last monastic deaconess was Sister Hripsime Sasounian (died in 2007) and on 25 September 2017, Ani-Kristi Manvelian a twenty-four-year-old woman was ordained in Tehran's St. Sarkis Mother Church as the first lay deaconess after many centuries. The Russian Orthodox Church had a female subdiaconate into the 20th century. The Holy Synod of the Orthodox Church of Greece restored a monastic female subdiaconate in 2004. And on 16 November 2016, the Holy Synod of the Greek Orthodox patriarchate of Alexandria also restored the female diaconate, actually for subdeaconesses only.

Cognates 
The Greek word diakonos (διάκονος) gave rise to the following terms from the history of Russia, not to be confused with each other: "dyak", "podyachy", "dyachok", in addition to "deacon" and "protodeacon".

Scots usage
In Scots, the title deacon is used for a head-workman, a master or chairman of a trade guild, or one who is adept, expert and proficient. The term deaconry refers to the office of a deacon or the trade guild under a deacon.

The most famous holder of this title was Deacon Brodie, who was a cabinet-maker and president of the Incorporation of Wrights and Masons as well as being a Burgh councillor of Edinburgh but at night led a double life as a burglar. He is thought to have inspired the story of The Strange Case of Dr Jekyll and Mr Hyde.

See also

Archdeacon
Cardinal deacon
Deaconess
Diakonissa
Protodeacon
Subdeacon
Gabbai

Footnotes

References

Church of Christ 
 Introducing the Church of Christ. Star Bible Publications, Fort Worth, Texas 76182.
 Evangelicalism & the Stone-Campbell Movement (William R. Baker, ed. Downers Grove: InterVarsity Press, 2002) for essays on Church of Christ ecclesiology.
 Thatcher, Tom; "The Deacon in the Pauline Church" in Christ's Victorious Church: Essays on Biblical Ecclesiology and Eschatology (Jon A. Weatherly, ed. Eugene, OR: Wipf and Stock Publishers, 2001).

Malankara Orthodox Syrian Church 
Deacons – St Mary's Malankara Orthodox Syrian Cathedral (Philadelphia, PA, US)

Lutheran Church 
 Concordia Deaconess Conference
 Lutheran Deaconess Association

 
Christian religious occupations
Religious leadership roles
Christian terminology
Local Christian church officials
Catholic ecclesiastical titles
Eastern Christian ecclesiastical offices
Anglican ecclesiastical offices
Methodism
Ecclesiastical titles
Major orders in the Catholic Church
Church of Scotland